Giuseppe Bagnera (10 July 1878, Palermo - 12 September 1953) was an Italian politician belonging to the Christian Democracy.  He was elected member of the Chamber of Deputies in 1948.

References

1878 births
1953 deaths
Politicians  from Palermo
Christian Democracy (Italy) politicians
20th-century Italian politicians
Members of the Chamber of Deputies (Italy)